Antonio Pietrangeli (19 January 191912 July 1968) was an Italian film director and screenwriter. He was a major practitioner of the Commedia all'italiana genre.

Biography
Pietrangeli was born in Rome. He started in the film industry by writing movie reviews for Italian cinema magazines such as Bianco e Nero and Cinema.

As a screenwriter, his works include Ossessione and La terra trema directed by Luchino Visconti, Fabiola directed by Alessandro Blasetti, and Europa '51 directed by Roberto Rossellini.

Pietrangeli's own directing debut was Il sole negli occhi, a 1953 film starring Gabriele Ferzetti.  This was followed by the Alberto Sordi comedies Lo scapolo (1956) and Souvenir d'Italie (1957).

The director's career highlights include Adua e le compagne (1960), a drama with Marcello Mastroianni and Simone Signoret, the supernatural comedy Fantasmi a Roma (1961), again with Mastroianni, Il magnifico cornuto (1964), a comedy of adultery starring Claudia Cardinale and Ugo Tognazzi, and the comedy-drama Io la conoscevo bene (1965) with Stefania Sandrelli.

He won the Nastro d'Argento for Best Director for Io la conoscevo bene.

Pietrangeli died from drowning by accident in the Gulf of Gaeta in 1968, while working on the film Come, quando, perché. The movie was completed by his friend, director Valerio Zurlini.

Filmography

 Prelude to Madness (1948)
 Empty Eyes (Il sole negli occhi) (1953)
 Girandola 1910 – Episode of Mid-Century Loves (Amori di mezzosecolo) (1953)
 The Bachelor (Lo scapolo) (1955)
 March's Child (Nata di marzo) (1957)
 Souvenirs d'Italie (Souvenir d'Italie) (1957)
 Adua and Her Friends (Adua e le compagne) (1960)
 Ghosts of Rome (Fantasmi a Roma) (1961)
 The Girl from Parma (La parmigiana) (1963)
 La visita (1963)
 The Magnificent Cuckold (Il magnifico cornuto) (1964)
 I Knew Her Well (Io la conoscevo bene) (1965)
 Fata Marta – Episode of Sex Quartet (Le fate) (1966)
 How, When and with Whom (Come, quando, perché) (1969)

References

Further reading

External links
 

Italian film directors
1919 births
1968 deaths
Film people from Rome
Nastro d'Argento winners
Burials at Campo Verano
Deaths by drowning